Comitas aequatorialis is a species of sea snail, a marine gastropod mollusc in the family Pseudomelatomidae, the turrids and allies.

Subspecies Comitas aequatorialis palawanica Powell, 1969

Distribution
This marine species occurs in the Indian Ocean off Somalia. The subspecies occurs off the Philippines.

References

  Thiele J., 1925. Gastropoden der Deutschen Tiefsee-Expedition. In:. Wissenschaftliche Ergebnisse der Deutschen Tiefsee-Expedition auf dem Dampfer "Valdivia" 1898–1899  II. Teil, vol. 17, No. 2, Gustav Fischer, Berlin

External links
 

aequatorialis
Gastropods described in 1925